Molla Azim Razgah (also Romanized as Mollā ‘Az̧īm Razgāh) is a village in Goli Jan Rural District, in the Central District of Tonekabon County, Mazandaran Province, Iran. At the 2006 census, its population was 159, in 51 families.

References 

Populated places in Tonekabon County